Ganggang, stylized GANGGANG, is an Indianapolis, Indiana-based American cultural development and social justice organization. Founded by partners Alan Bacon and Malina "Mali" Simone Jeffers in late 2020, Ganggang works to showcase and financially support Black visual artists and their work. Their efforts have included organizing artist collectives, fine art fairs, a curated exhibition at the Indianapolis Museum of Art at Newfields, and live performances.

History
From June to August 2020, Malina "Mali" Jeffers and Alan Bacon helped coordinate eighteen artists who painted a Black Lives Matter street mural in Indianapolis on Indiana Avenue during the peak of the George Floyd protests. The group of artists became known as "The Eighteen Art Collective". At the time, Bacon was working at United Way of Central Indiana, and Jeffers had just left a position as vice president of marketing at an Indianapolis property group. Ganggang officially formed in November 2020.

During the 2021 NCAA Division I men's basketball tournament in March, Ganggang organized art fairs and performances by hundreds of dancers, musicians, and spoken word artists. The three-week event, called Swish, was a partnership with the Arts Council of Indianapolis and the Indianapolis Cultural Trail.

In November 2021, Ganggang planned to curate an exhibition featuring The Eighteen Art Collective at the Indianapolis Museum of Art at Newfields, where Jeffers is on the board of governors. However, after controversies at the museum involving the museum's president and CEO at the time, Charles L. Venable, Ganggang pulled out of the show. A year after the resignation of Venable, as well as continued efforts by the museum to better its relationship with the Indianapolis community, Ganggang acted as guest curators for an expanded version of the originally planned Newfields exhibition, now titled "We. The Culture."

Throughout 2021 and 2022, Ganggang sponsored a number of public events, including a free concert series outside Clowes Memorial Hall and "BLACK: A Festival of Joy". They also commissioned murals, including one by Indianapolis artist Ashley Nora on The Stutz (a renovated building previously owned by Stutz Motor Company) and one by Amiah Mims in Marathon Health's office in Carmel, Indiana.

In March 2022, Ganggang partnered with IndyGo, with the two companies sharing space in a former Key Bank building.

Butter art fair

In 2021, Ganggang created the Butter fine art fair (stylized BUTTER), a multi-day art exhibition that takes place over Labor Day weekend at The Stutz building in downtown Indianapolis. The first Butter resulted in the sale of 42 pieces of art totaling $65,000, with more sales resulting after the fair. Artists were not charged a fee to take part in the exhibition, and were not charged a commission on sales. 

The second iteration of Butter, called BUTTER 2, took place over four days in September 2022, with triple the physical size. The fair included the addition of a dance party on Saturday night called "Melt", several live performances, a merchandise store, and walking tours from Indianapolis historian Sampson Levingston. The four-member curation team was composed of Bacon, Jeffers, former executive director of the Indianapolis Contemporary Braydee Euliss, and former Indianapolis Museum of Art curator and The Art Assignment creator Sarah Urist Green. The exhibition resulted in over $250,000 in art sales. In a November 2022 article discussing Butter and Ganggang's role in the evolution of the Indianapolis art scene, The New York Times stated that Ganggang, despite being "barely two years old, [... was] already finding its way into the national art scene, elevating artists of color, maximizing their earnings by giving them all the profit for their work, and proving that Indianapolis is more than a sports city."

Funding and governance
Ganggang officially formed in November 2020 with $250,000 in initial seed money. The organization's primary benefactor is the Central Indiana Community Foundation. Bacon and Jeffers run the firm alongside a board of directors that include former Indianapolis Colt Gary Brackett and A'Lelia Bundles, who is the great-great-granddaughter of Madam C. J. Walker.

Ganggang contains elements of both a non-profit and for-profit enterprise. The not-for-profit side develops programming related to their goals and the for-profit side invests in cultural entrepreneurs. Jeffers explained to Indianapolis Monthly in a February 2021 interview, "We are wanting to support those who, by tradition, aren't recognized by arts organizations. It's not easy to find support, especially if you are a cultural entrepreneur. You can't find funding if you are a for-profit entity, and we shouldn't have to force artists to become a not-for-profit to receive funding."

References

2020 establishments in Indiana
American artist groups and collectives
Companies based in Indianapolis